Ástþór Magnússon Wium (born 4 August 1953) is an Icelandic businessman and peace activist, who is best known as a perennial candidate for the office of President of Iceland.

Background and education 
After finishing the landspróf (national examination), Ástþór studied at the Commercial College of Iceland before moving to the United Kingdom in order to study commercial photography and marketing at the Medway College of Art and Design.

Business career 
Ástþór brought Eurocard to Iceland in 1979, making it the first credit card company operating in Iceland. The success of Eurocard made him financially independent.

Political career 
Ástþór unsuccessfully campaigned for the post of President of Iceland four times: in 1996, 2004, 2012 and 2016. In 2000, he failed to get the necessary 1,500 signatures and therefore was not on the ballot. On 1 June 2012, his candidacy was revoked because he had failed to obtain the mandatory certificate from the senior electoral officer in the Northwest constituency; as he was the only challenger, this meant that President Ólafur Ragnar Grímsson was returned unopposed. Ástþór was the founder and chairperson of the Democracy Movement, a political party founded in 1998 for the purpose of promoting direct democracy and e-democracy. The party folded after the 2009 general elections. He also founded the peace movement Peace2000.

In 1996, he distributed the book The Use of Bessastaðir to every household in Iceland.

Personal life 
Ástþór is married to the Russian-born lawyer Natalia Wium.

References 

1953 births
Living people